George L. Bradley JR  (born June 26, 1994) is an American football linebacker who is currently a free agent. He played college football at Pittsburgh.

High school
Bradley attended Trotwood-Madison High School and was a two-time Associated Press All-Ohio Division II honoree.

College career
Bradley started in 8 games at Pittsburgh, finished his career with 106 tackles, 17 for loss and 4 sacks.

Professional career
Bradley signed with the Baltimore Ravens as an undrafted free agent on May 5, 2017. Bradley made the Ravens 53-man roster as an undrafted rookie, unfortunately his rookie season was cut short due to injury. He suffered a torn ACL in Week 2 against the Browns and was placed on injured reserve on September 19, 2017.

On August 31, 2018, Bradley was placed on the physically unable to perform list to start the season while recovering from the torn ACL.

On March 19, 2019, Bradley was released by the Ravens.

References

External links
Pittsburgh Panthers bio

1994 births
Living people
Players of American football from Dayton, Ohio
Pittsburgh Panthers football players
Baltimore Ravens players